Dinshaw Bilimoria (1904 in Kirkee – 1942) was an Indian actor and director.

He has been referred to as the John Barrymore of Indian cinema.

Life 
Dinshaw Bilimoria made his debut in 1925 in N. D. Sarpotdar's mythological-historical film Chhatrapati Sambhaji. In 1927, he moved to the film company Imperial Films Company and partnered with Sulochana in Mohan Bhavnani's Wildcat of Bombay (1927) and R. S. Choudhury's Anarkali (1928), which were his first big successes.

At the end of the silent film era from 1927 to 1929 and in the early talkies in India from 1933 to 1939, Bilimoria and Sulochana formed a popular romantic lead, which delighted a broad audience, especially in romantic dramas by R. S. Choudhury. Billimoria was considered the highest paid silent movie star in India. After 1932, they shot talkies remakes of several of the silent film hits, among them Anarkali (1935) and Bambai Ki Billi/Wildcat of Bombay (1936).

He appeared in several films for the film company between 1929 and 1932 for Ranjit Movietone under the directors Chandulal Shah, Nanubhai Vakil and Nandlal Jaswantlal.

Bilimoria probably directed two films in 1940 and 1942; but Azadi-e-Watan (1940) may be a dubbed version of a US import.

His brother was the actor Eddie Bilimoria.

Filmography

Literature 
 The entry of Dinshaw Bilimoria in Ashish Rajadhyaksha, Paul Willemen: Encyclopaedia of Indian Cinema, S. 66

References

External links 

 
 Filmografie bei citwf.com

1904 births
1942 deaths
Parsi people
Indian male film actors
Male actors in Hindi cinema
Indian male silent film actors
Hindi-language film directors
20th-century Indian male actors
20th-century Indian film directors